Ivanovskoye is a rural locality (a selo) in ivanovsky Selsoviet of Selemdzhinsky District, Amur Oblast, Russia. The population was 374 as of 2018. There are 9 streets.

Geography 
Ivanovskoye is located in the valley of the Elga River, 64 km southeast of Ekimchan (the district's administrative centre) by road. Olginsk is the nearest rural locality.

References 

Rural localities in Selemdzhinsky District